Del bell'idolo mio (HWV 104) is a dramatic secular cantata for soprano written by Georg Frideric Handel in 1707-09. Other catalogues of Handel's music have referred to the work as HG l,48 (there is no HHA designation of the work). The title of the cantata translates as "Of my beautiful idol".

History
The copyist's bill for Ruspoli is dated 31 August 1709 however there is no evidence that Handel was still in Rome at that time. Some aspects of the manuscript connect the cantata with others that were written in the spring of 1707.

Synopsis
The cantata describes the quest of the singer as he ventures into the Underworld to rescue the soul of his beloved Nice.

Structure
The work is scored for solo soprano and keyboard (with scattered figured bass markings). The cantata contains three recitative-aria pairings.

A typical performance of the work takes almost eleven minutes.

Movements
The work consists of six movements:

(Movements do not contain repeat markings unless indicated. The number of bars is the raw number in the manuscript—not including repeat markings. The above is taken from volume 50, starting at page 48, of the Händel-Gesellschaft edition.)

See also
List of cantatas by George Frideric Handel

References

 

Cantatas by George Frideric Handel
1709 compositions